(Spanish, meaning "Go with God") may refer to:
 "Vaya con Dios" (song), a song written by Larry Russell, Inez James, and Buddy Pepper
 Vaya Con Dios (band), a Belgian band
 Vaya Con Dios (album), their debut album
 Vaya con Dios (film), a German comedy film starring Daniel Brühl
 Hard Time Romance or Vaya con Dios, an American romance film by John Lee Hancock
 "Vaya con Dios", an episode of Law & Order
 "Two (Vaya con Dios)", a song by Ill Niño, from the album Confession.

See also 
Vaya Con Tioz, an album by Böhse Onkelz